Gutalac, officially the Municipality of Gutalac (Subanen: Benwa Gutalac; Chavacano: Municipalidad de Gutalac), is a 2nd class municipality in the province of Zamboanga del Norte, Philippines. According to the 2020 census, it has a population of 36,090 people.

Geography

Barangays
Gutalac is politically subdivided into 33 barangays.

Climate

Demographics

Economy

References

External links
 Gutalac Profile at PhilAtlas.com
 [ Philippine Standard Geographic Code]
Philippine Census Information

Municipalities of Zamboanga del Norte